This is a list of the Birmingham board schools, built between the Elementary Education Act 1870 which established board schools, and the Education Act 1902, which replaced school boards with Local Education Authorities. Most of the board schools were designed by the firm Martin & Chamberlain (M&C).

List of board schools
From these sources:

Other board schools
Cotteridge School, 1900
Using source:
Soho Road (Benson Road). Benson Junior School, Benson Road, Winson Road, 1888, Grade II listed, 
Grove Junior School, Grove Lane, Handsworth, late 19th century, Grade II listed, 

Using source:
Constitution Hill 1883 (demolished 1967)
Upper Highgate Street (demolished)
Moseley Road
Marlborough Road School 1896

Other board schools acquired in 1891 when Birmingham was expanded

Kings Norton Village Board School, 1878 by Kings Norton School Board.
Mary Street School, Balsall Heath, 1878 by Kings Norton School Board. Demolished.
Stirchley Street School, 1879 by Kings Norton School Board.

Other schools from the board school era

See also
Birmingham board schools – history
List of former board schools in Brighton and Hove
London School Board

References

Further reading
''John Ruskin and Victorian Architecture, Michael W Brooks, 1989 

History of education in the United Kingdom
School boards
Lists of buildings and structures in Birmingham, West Midlands